is a town in Aomori Prefecture, Japan. , the town had an estimated population of 14,558 in 6162 households, and a population density of 390 persons per km².

Geography
Fujisaki occupies the flatlands within Minamitsugaru District of south-central Aomori.

Neighboring municipalities 
Aomori
Kuroishi
Hirosaki
Itayanagi
Inakadate

Climate
The town has a cold humid continental climate (Köppen Dfb) characterized by warm short summers and long cold winters with heavy snowfall. The average annual temperature in Fujisaki is 10.6 °C. The average annual rainfall is 1288 mm with September as the wettest month. The temperatures are highest on average in August, at around 24.0 °C, and lowest in January, at around -1.8 °C.

Demographics
Per Japanese census data, the population of Fujisaki has steadily decreased over the past 60 years.

History
During the Edo period, the area around Fujisaki was controlled by the Tsugaru clan of Hirosaki Domain. With the Meiji period establishment of the modern municipalities system on April 1, 1889 Fujisaki was chartered as a village within Minamitsugaru District, Aomori. On May 20, 1923, Fujisaki attained town status. On February 1, 1955, Fujisaki merged with neighboring Junisato Village. It annexed a portion of Itayanagi Village on August 10, 1956. On January 1, 2006, it merged with the neighboring town of Tokiwa. On September 1, 2007, a portion of the Namioka part of Aomori left Aomori and merged into Fujisaki.

Government
Fujisaki has a mayor-council form of government with a directly elected mayor and a unicameral town legislature of 14 members. Minamitsugaru District (with the exception of the town of Ōwani contributes one member to the Aomori Prefectural Assembly. In terms of national politics, the city is part of Aomori 3rd district of the lower house of the Diet of Japan.

Economy
The economy of Fujisaki is heavily dependent on agriculture, notably rice and horticulture. The Fuji apple was developed here.

Education
Fujisaki has three public elementary schools and two public junior high schools operated by the town government. The town does not have a high school.

Transportation

Railway
East Japan Railway Company (JR East) - Ōu Main Line

East Japan Railway Company (JR East) - Gonō Line
 -

Highway

Notable people from Fujisaki
 Taro Kimura, politician (1965-2017)

Mascots

Fujisaki has two mascots, Fujimaru-kun and Jumbou-kun.

Fujimaru-kun (ふじ丸くん) is a winged apple. He is most likely a Fuji apple. Despite his wings, he cannot fly.
Jumbou-kun (ジャン坊くん) is a rice ball. His dream is to become Fujisakis mayor. There are snacks of the same name produced in Fujisaki which feature Jumbou-kun's face.

References

External links 

 

 
Towns in Aomori Prefecture